MN is a 1954 Filipino movie produced by Sampaguita Pictures based on the comic book of the same name by Pablo S. Gomez. This film starred Sampaguita players including Carmen Rosales,  Oscar Moreno,  Alicia Vergel, César Ramírez (actor) and Aruray.

Cast
Carmen Rosales as Marissa
Alicia Vergel as Ada
Oscar Moreno as Oscar
Cesar Ramirez as Armando

External links

1954 films
Philippine black-and-white films
Tagalog-language films
Philippine romantic drama films
1954 romantic drama films